Shim or Sim is a Korean surname. There are six Shim clans in Korea based in the regions of Cheongsong, Pungsan, Samcheok, Buyu, Uiryeong, and Jeonju. The biggest Shim clan is Cheongsong; they comprise about 85% of all those with the surname Shim. Fourteen percent of all Korean Shims are members of the Pungsan and Samcheok clans. As of 2000, there were 252,255 people with this surname in South Korea, less than 1% of the population.

Notable people with the surname 
Shim On (1375–1419), Joseon period government official and father of Queen Soheon
Shim Sa-jeong (1707–1769), Joseon period painter
Shim Eun-ha, South Korean actress
Shim Hyung-rae, South Korean former comedian and filmmaker
Shim Eun-kyung, South Korean actress
Shim Hyung-tak, South Korean actor
Shim Hye-jin, South Korean actress and model
Shim Eun-jin, South Korean actress and singer, former member of girl group Baby Vox
Shim Mina, South Korean singer
Shim Chang-min, South Korean singer and member of boy band TVXQ
Sim Jae-won, South Korean footballer
Sim Soo-bong, South Korean singer
Sim Woo-yeon, South Korean footballer
Sim Bong-geun, South Korean archaeologist and university professor
Shim Sang-ho, South Korean businessman
Shim Eui-sik, South Korean former professional ice hockey forward and Korean hockey point record holder
Shim Hwa-jin, South Korean academic and former president of Sungshin Women's University
Sim Sang-jung, South Korean politician
Sim Hun (1901–1936), South Korean writer
Sim Kwon-ho, South Korean Olympic Greco-Roman wrestling gold medalist

List of Cheongsong Shim's generation names 

 19th: Ji (0지, 0之)
 20th: Neung (능0, 能0)
 21st: Ui (의0, 宜0)
 22nd: Taek (0택, 0澤)
 23rd: Sang (상0, 相0)
 24th: Seop (0섭, 0燮)
 25th: Jae (재0, 載0)
 26th: Bo (0보, 0輔)
 27th: Gyu (규0, 揆0)
 28th: Yong (0용, 0用)
 29th: Yeong (영0, 寧0)
 30th: Gi (0기, 0起)
 31st: Jang (장0, 章0)
 32nd: Hu (0후, 0厚)

Emblem of Cheongsong Shim 

The Cheongsong Shim clan's emblem depicts rivers, pines, and the Hanja for Shim. In Korea, rivers and pines signify human longevity. The circle was modeled on the Sun and the Moon, which symbolize that descendants will move forward, succeed, and be worthy of their ancestors.

Genealogical table 
In 2002, a version of Cheongsong Shim genealogical tables was published as a book. It includes 10 volumes of genealogical tables, an index, and an introduction to the history of the Cheongsong Shim clan. According to an officer of the Cheongsong Shim, they will eventually publish other genealogical tables on the internet.

Family feud 
When the tomb of Yun Gwan was rediscovered in the 18th century, it sparked a 300-year-old family feud between the Yun and Shim clans. The reason for the feud was because a member of the Shim clan was buried uphill from Yun Gwan's tomb, destroying part of the original tomb in the process. The feud was finally settled in 2008.

See also 
List of Korean family names

References

External links 
  Homepage of Cheongsong Shim Clan

Korean-language surnames